Tait Tower (also known as Tait's Tower and officially as the Tower of Empire) was a tower in the art deco style constructed at the summit of Ibrox Hill in Bellahouston Park in Glasgow in Scotland as part of the Empire Exhibition, Scotland 1938.

The tower was the centrepiece of the Empire Exhibition and its image featured on many of the souvenirs that could be bought at the exhibition site.

The Empire Exhibition took place at a time when Glasgow was the centre of British shipbuilding and engineering, and the materials – steel beams riveted together and clad in corrugated steel – were produced by Glasgow manufacturing plants. Tait's design and readily available materials made it possible for the tower to be constructed in only nine weeks.

The tower was dismantled in July 1939 after the exhibition closed. The foundations remain at Bellahouston Park.

Thomas' son Gordon Tait also worked on the project.

In December 2007, the Tait Tower was included in a 3D graphic reconstruction of the Empire Exhibition by the Digital Design Studio at Glasgow School of Art, sourced from contemporary photographs, film footage, sketches and drawings from the archive of the Mitchell Library.

See also
 List of tallest buildings and structures in Glasgow

References

External links
Information about the tower and picture
Information about the 1938 exhibition and the tower
Tower of Empire - 3D reconstruction of the tower by Glasgow School of Art
Photographs of the Tait Tower - Mitchell Library

Towers completed in 1938
1938 establishments in Scotland
Art Deco architecture in Scotland
Skyscrapers in Glasgow
Former towers
Demolished buildings and structures in Scotland
Towers in Scotland
World's fair architecture in Glasgow
1939 disestablishments in Scotland
Buildings and structures demolished in 1939